Sardar Tanveer Ilyas Khan is a Kashmiri politician who is the current Prime Minister of Azad Jammu and Kashmir since 18 April 2022 & President of the Pakistan Tehreek-e-Insaf, Azad Kashmir. He belongs from Rawalakot, Azad Kashmir. He is also a Businessman the owner of Centarurus which is the largest Shopping mall of Islamabad.

References

Living people
Azad Kashmiri politicians 
Pakistan Tehreek-e-Insaf politicians
Prime Ministers of Azad Kashmir
Year of birth missing (living people)